Thomas Jefferson High School was a high school in the East New York section of Brooklyn, New York. It was the alma mater of many people who grew up in the Great Depression and World War II and rose to prominence in the arts, literature, and other fields. In 2007, the New York City Department of Education closed the school and broke it into several small schools because of low graduation rates.

History
Thomas Jefferson High School, located at 400 Pennsylvania Avenue, had its groundbreaking in 1922 with New York City mayor John Francis Hylan officiating.

Elias Lieberman (1883-1969), American poet, writer and educator, known for the 1916 poem "I Am an American,” served as principal from 1924 to 1940.  Alumni of his time include movie star and comedian Danny Kaye (who did not graduate) and songwriter Jack Lawrence. Additionally, Thomas Jefferson was one of seven public high schools in New York to receive a M. P. Moller pipe organ in 1926. The instrument was removed and discarded in the 1990s.

A relatively prosperous lower middle class community throughout the interwar epoch, the surrounding neighborhood of East New York faced a host of socioeconomic problems in the mid-to-late 20th century, including widespread unemployment and crime stemming from a lack of private investment (exemplified by redlining, mortgage discrimination and the gradual diminution of remunerative manufacturing jobs) amid the segregated wave of postwar suburbanization. In 1991, Darryl Sharpe, a ninth-grade student who was an innocent bystander, was shot to death in the school. Another youth was trying to help his brother in a fistfight, drew a gun, and opened fire in the crowded hallway. The three shots killed the 16-year-old student and critically wounded a teacher, Robert Anderson, who was approaching to intervene. At the time, education officials in New York called it "one of the school system's worst crimes" and noted that besides an accidental shooting in 1989, it was the first killing of a student in a school in more than a decade. The 14-year old shooter, Jason Bentley, was sentenced to three to nine years in prison. Bentley was on parole for this homicide on June 22, 1997, when Luis Cabral Corcino was murdered in a robbery. Bentley was convicted of murder and was sentenced to 35 years to life.

In 1992, a 15-year-old student at the school shot two other students, who died thereafter, in the hallway an hour before then-mayor David Dinkins was supposed to tour the school. The shooter, 15-year-old Kahlil Sumpter, was sentenced to between 6 and twenty years in prison. He was released on parole in 1998.

In 2007, the New York City Department of Education closed the school and broke it into several small schools because of low graduation rates.

In the photograph above, the main entrance of TJHS is clearly engraved with a quote from Abraham Lincoln, "May reverence for the laws become the political religion of the nation." For 90 years students, and perhaps faculty, have wondered why the authorities were unable to find an appropriate quotation from Thomas Jefferson himself to grace the entrance to his namesake school.

Today
Since 2007, the school building is known as the Thomas Jefferson Educational Campus, and is the home of:
The High School for Civil Rights
The FDNY High School for Fire and Life Safety
The Performing Arts and Technology High School
The World Academy for Total Community Health High School

In 2015, two of the new schools were graduating about 70 percent of their students and the other two have graduation rates in the 50s. In New York City overall in 2015, just over 78 percent of New York State students who entered high school in 2011 graduated on time according to state officials. However, the percentage is 88 percent for white students and only 65 percent for black and Hispanic students during the same time period.

Notable alumni

Harvey Averne, Grammy winner twice
Howard E. Babbush, lawyer and politician
Ralph Bakshi, animator
Sandy Baron, comedian and stage, film, and television actor
Roy C. Bennett, popular music composer
Lloyd Blankfein, former CEO of Goldman Sachs
Riddick Bowe, boxer
Dame Helen Rappel Bordman, Fondation Monet
Harry Boykoff, NBA basketball player
John Brockington, Ohio State Buckeyes' 1968 undefeated national championship football team; running back for the NFL Green Bay Packers
Henry Cohen, director of Föhrenwald, Displaced Persons camp in post-World War II Germany
Hy Cohen (born 1931), Major League Baseball player
Dorian Daughtry, baseball player and criminal
Hal David, lyricist of pop songs, partnered with Burt Bacharach
Shawon Dunston, major league baseball player
Leroy Ellis, former NBA center, 1971–72 Los Angeles Lakers championship team
Sylvia Fine, lyricist
Mel Finkelstein, Pulitzer Prize nominated photographer
Jack Garfinkel, former Boston Celtics player
Hy Gotkin, basketball player
Sidney Green, NBA player
Sharon Jones, soul singer
Danny Kaye (born David Daniel Kaminsky), actor
Ezra Jack Keats (born Jacob Ezra Katz), illustrator and author of children's books
Daniel Keyes, author: Flowers For Algernon
Harry Landers, actor
Jack Lawrence, songwriter
Steve Lawrence (born Sidney Leibowitz), popular music singer, and actor
Bernard Lepkofker, competitive judoka 
Joel S. Levine, planetary scientist, author, and research professor in applied science at the College of William & Mary
Al Lewis, actor, political activist
Lil' Fame, rapper and member of M.O.P.
Irving Malin, literary critic
Paul Mazursky, Hollywood director
Jim McMillian, former NBA forward, 1971–72 Los Angeles Lakers championship team
Alan B. Miller, founder, chairman and CEO of Universal Health Services
Boris Nachamkin (born 1933), NBA basketball player
Linda November, singer
Martin Pope, physical chemist
Jack Rollins, film and television producer and talent manager of comedians and television personalities
Francine Shapiro, psychologist, founder of EMDR Therapy
Willa Schneberg, poet
Phil Sellers, former NBA player
Jimmy Smits, actor
Sid Tanenbaum (1925–1986), professional basketball player
Martin Tytell, expert in manual typewriters
Moses M. Weinstein, lawyer and politician
Allen Weisselberg, businessman
Saul Weprin, attorney and politician
Otis Wilson, linebacker for NFL Chicago Bears
Shelley Winters, actress
Max Zaslofsky, NBA guard/forward, one-time FT% leader, one-time points leader, All-Star, ABA coach
Howard Zinn, historian, political activist

References

External links

Thomas Jefferson High School, Museum of Family History
TJHS yearbooks, 1927-1987
Alumni website, ad-free

Defunct high schools in Brooklyn
East New York, Brooklyn
Public high schools in Brooklyn
Educational institutions disestablished in 2007
Educational institutions established in 1922
1922 establishments in New York City